The Tokunoshima spiny rat (Tokudaia tokunoshimensis) is a rodent found only on the island of Tokunoshima in the Ryukyu Islands of Japan. Due to its small habitat, it is considered endangered. It is commonly found in the secondary and primary subtropical moist broadleaf forests of this island. The karyotype has an odd diploid number, 2n = 45. Like its relative T. osimensis, it is one of the few mammals that lack a Y chromosome and SRY gene.

The species is threatened by deforestation and predation by feral cats and dogs.

See also
 Ellobius lutescens
 Ellobius tancrei

References

Tokudaia
Endemic mammals of Japan
Endemic fauna of the Ryukyu Islands
Mammals described in 2006